James Thompson, DD (b Ilkley 9 March 1802; d Oxford 26 December 1860) was an Oxford college head in the 19th century.

He graduated BA from Lincoln College, Oxford in 1823, MA in 1826 and BD in 1833. He was a Fellow of Lincoln from 1823 and also held the College living at Twyford, Buckinghamshire. Radford was Rector of Lincoln College, Oxford, from 1851 until his death.

References

People from Ilkley
1802 births
1860 deaths
Alumni of Lincoln College, Oxford
Fellows of Lincoln College, Oxford
Rectors of Lincoln College, Oxford
19th-century English Anglican priests